Phil Joy (born 4 September 1991) is an English professional rugby league footballer who plays as a  for Oldham (Heritage № 1303) in the Betfred Championship.

Background
Joy was born in Oldham, Greater Manchester, England.

Career
Joy made his Oldham début in 2012.

References

External links
Oldham profile

1991 births
Living people
English rugby league players
Oldham R.L.F.C. players
Rugby league players from Oldham
Rugby league props